Psammosteida also called as Psammosteoidei is a suborder of pteraspidid heterostracan agnathans.  The psammosteids had broad, flattened bodies, suggesting a predominantly benthic habit.  The earliest unequivocal psammosteid is Drepanaspis of Early Devonian Germany, which is either included in the family Psammosteidae, or placed within its own family, Drepanaspididae.  If the late Silurian/Early Devonian Weigeltaspis is a psammosteid, as opposed to being a traquairaspid, then that genus, instead, would be the oldest psammosteid.  However, its placement within Heterostraci remains a matter of debate.  Other notable psammosteids include Psammosteus, and Obruchevia, two genera of enormous species with dorsal shields around one meter in diameter.  The Psammosteids were the only heterostracans to survive to the end of the Devonian, where they finally perish during the Hangenberg event.

References 

Devonian jawless fish
Devonian extinctions
Heterostraci
Fish suborders